Nicholas George Gilder (born 21 December 1951) is a British-Canadian musician who first came to prominence as the frontman for the glam rock band Sweeney Todd. He later had a successful solo career as a singer/songwriter.

Biography
Born in London, England, Gilder was raised in Vancouver, Canada. He began his career as front-man for the glam rock band Sweeney Todd, which later briefly featured a very young Bryan Adams. Sweeney Todd had a number one hit, "Roxy Roller", that held on to the top spot in the Canadian music charts for three weeks in 1976. It went on to win a Juno Award for "Best Selling Single" in 1977.

Feeling they had international scope, Gilder and fellow band member, guitarist, and songwriting partner James McCulloch left the band and signed a US record deal. It was his second solo album, which spawned the hit "Hot Child in the City", that gave Gilder chart success in the United States. That song went to No. 1 both in Canada and the US. It also earned him two more Juno Awards: "Single of the Year" and for "Most Promising Male Vocalist of the Year" in Canada as well as a People's Choice Award in the US. It failed to chart in the United Kingdom, though it was featured on Top of the Pops and also in a Hot Gossip dance routine on The Kenny Everett Video Show. Since this success, Gilder has had only minimal success in Canada and none of his subsequent releases featured in the US Top 40.

Gilder has also been successful as a songwriter for artists such as Bette Midler, Joe Cocker, Pat Benatar and Toni Basil. In 1984, the band Scandal featuring Patty Smyth had a US Top 10 hit with "The Warrior," which was written by Gilder and Holly Knight and earned him a BMI Airplay Award.  The song also reached No. 1 in Canada, making him the first Canadian artist to reach the Top of the Canadian chart as lead singer for a band (Sweeney Todd with "Roxy Roller"), a solo artist ("Hot Child in the City") and songwriter for another artist.

Gilder's songs have been used in several movies such as Youngblood with Rob Lowe,  The Wraith with Charlie Sheen, Barb Wire with Pamela Anderson, Scenes From the Goldmine, that included a cameo appearance in the movie by Gilder, and in TV series Sex and the City, That '70s Show, Ed (TV series), Nip/Tuck, and most recently in the 2010 movie The Runaways, where "Roxy Roller" was featured early in the film.

Armand Van Helden sampled "Rockaway" on his 2005 club hit, "When the Lights Go Down." The following year Nemesis recorded "Hot Child in the City" for their 2006 debut CD, Rise Up and Rocket recorded "Backstreet Noise" for their CD, Girls with Candy Hearts.

Gilder was to release an album called A Night on the Town, A Day in the Country in 2005, but it was shelved.

Gilder returned to Canada in the mid-1990s, where he continues to tour as of 2020 (until COVID-19 pandemic in Canada). He has settled in the Vancouver, British Columbia area, where he lives with his family.

Discography

Solo 
Studio albums:
 1977: You Know Who You Are, Chrysalis Records
 1978: City Nights, Chrysalis Records (No. 13 Can, No. 33 Billboard)
 1979: Frequency, Chrysalis Records (No. 71 Can, No. 127 Billboard)
 1980: Rock America, Casablanca Records
 1981: Body Talk Muzik, Casablanca Records
 1985: Nick Gilder, RCA Records
 1997: Stairways, Spinner Music Group/Gilder Records
 1999: Longtime Coming, Page Music/Oasis/Orchard

Compilations:
 2001: The Best of Nick Gilder, EMI- Capitol Music/Razor & Tie Entertainment (The Chrysalis Years)

Singles

With Sweeney Todd
Album:
 1975: Sweeney Todd, London Records (No. 14 Can)

Singles:
 1975: "Rock 'N' Roll Story", London Records
 1975: "Sweeney Todd Folder", London Records (No. 36 Can)
 1975: "Roxy Roller", London Records (No. 1 Can)

Songwriting contributions

‡ Also provided background vocals on "Don't Walk Away" & "Cool Zero"
‡‡ Not included in the soundtrack release

References

External links 

1951 births
Living people
Canadian male singers
Canadian rock singers
Canadian songwriters
Musicians from London
Musicians from Vancouver
Writers from London
Writers from Vancouver
English emigrants to Canada
Glam rock musicians
Chrysalis Records artists
Casablanca Records artists
Juno Award for Single of the Year winners
Juno Award for Breakthrough Artist of the Year winners